Iliya Todorov (born 16 July 1953) is a Bulgarian biathlete. He competed in the 20 km individual event at the 1976 Winter Olympics.

References

1953 births
Living people
Bulgarian male biathletes
Olympic biathletes of Bulgaria
Biathletes at the 1976 Winter Olympics
Place of birth missing (living people)